Shaw is most commonly a surname and rarely a given name.

British name
The name is of English and Scottish origin. In some cases, the surname is an Americanization of a similar-sounding Ashkenazic Jewish surname. In England and Scotland, the name is a topographic name for someone who lived by a copse or thicket. This name is derived from the Middle English schage, shage, schawe, and shawe, from the Old English sceaga meaning "dweller by the wood". The name can also be a habitational name derived from places named after these words. The English surname was established in Ireland during the 17th century. In Scotland and Ireland, the surname can also be an English form of several surnames derived from the Gaelic personal name Sitheach meaning "wolf".

People with the given name "Shaw"
Shaw Clifton (born 1945), 18th General of The Salvation Army
Walter Shaw Sparrow (1862–1940), British writer on art and architecture
Shaw Taylor (1924–2015), British actor and TV presenter

People with the surname "Shaw"

A–E
A. G. L. Shaw (1916–2012), Australian historian
A. R. Shaw (1922–2013), American educator and politician
Aaron Shaw (representative) (1811–1887), U.S. Representative from Illinois
Adam Shaw (journalist), British business journalist and presenter
Adam Shaw (painter) (born 1957), American painter
Aeneas Shaw (1740–1814), Canadian soldier and political figure
Alfred Shaw (1842–1907), English cricketer
Alice Marion Shaw (born 1890), American composer and pianist
Amos F. Shaw, American politician
Andrea Shaw (born 1983), American professional bodybuilder
Andrew Shaw (ice hockey) (born 1991), NHL player (Montreal Canadiens)
Anna Howard Shaw (1847–1919), American suffragette
Anne Gillespie Shaw (1904–1982), Scottish engineer and businesswoman
Archie Shaw (1922–1985), Scottish footballer
Artie Shaw (1910–2004), American bandleader
Ashley Shaw (born 1991), English cricketer
Barbara Shaw (politician) (1942–2021), American politician
Bernard Shaw (disambiguation), several people
Bill Shaw (footballer, born 1886) (born 1886), Scottish footballer
Bill Kennedy Shaw (1901–1979), British army captain, explorer
Billy Shaw (born 1938), American football player
Brewster H. Shaw (born 1945), retired U.S. Air Force colonel and former NASA astronaut
Brian Shaw (born 1966), former NBA basketball player
Brian Shaw (strongman), American professional strongman and winner of World's Strongest Man
Bryan Shaw (baseball) (born 1987), American baseball player
Caroline Shaw (born 1982), American Pulitzer-Prize-winning composer
Charles Thurstan Shaw (1914–2013), English archaeologist
Clay Shaw (1913–1974), charged by Jim Garrison with conspiracy to murder John F. Kennedy
Cliff Shaw, computer programmer
David Shaw (disambiguation), several people
Donald Douglas Shaw (1834–1859), New York assemblyman-elect
Eddie Shaw (1937–2018), American blues saxophonist, arranger and bandleader
Eddie Shaw (rock musician), American bass guitarist and founding member of the rock band The Monks
Emma L. Shaw, American magazine editor
Esther Popel Shaw (1896–1958), poet of the Harlem Renaissance
Eyre Massey Shaw, British Army and London Fireman.

F–O
Fiona Shaw (born 1958), Irish actress who plays Petunia Dursley in the Harry Potter films
Flora Madeline Shaw (1864–1927), Canadian nurse and nursing teacher
Frank L. Shaw (1887–1958), former mayor of Los Angeles, California
Frankie Shaw (born 1986), American actress
Frederick H. Shaw (1864–1924), British citizen who had a prominent role in the creation of the Spanish Institute of Provision, 1908
Sir Frederick Shaw, 3rd Baronet from 1869, (1799–1876), Irish Conservative MP in the United Kingdom Parliament
George Bernard Shaw (1856–1950), Irish playwright
George Shaw (disambiguation), several people
Graham Shaw (footballer, born 1934) (1934–1998), former Sheffield United footballer
Henry Shaw (philanthropist) (1800–1889), English-American philanthropist
Henry Wheeler Shaw (1818–1895), "Josh Billings", American humorist
Herman Shaw (1892–1950), English geophysicist and museum director
Irwin Shaw (1913–1984), American playwright, screenwriter and author
JR Shaw (born 1934), Canadian businessman
Jane Shaw (born 1963) Anglican/Episcopalian priest (England and United States)
Jane S. Shaw, American free-market environmentalist
Joe Shaw (footballer, born 1928) (born 1928), former Sheffield United footballer
John Shaw (disambiguation), several people
Jonathan Shaw (disambiguation), several people 
Julia Shaw (cyclist) (born 1965), British physicist and racing cyclist
Julia Shaw (psychologist) (born 1987), Canadian psychologist
Kathryn Shaw, Canadian theatre actor and director
Kathryn L. Shaw, economist
L. M. Shaw (1848–1932), American banker and politician, Secretary of the Treasury
Leander J. Shaw Jr. (1930–2015), American jurist
Lemuel Shaw (1781–1861), American jurist
Leslie Shaw, (born 1989), Peruvian model and singer
Lindsey Shaw (born 1989), American actress
Luke Shaw (born 1995), English footballer
Malcolm Shaw (born 1947), English lawyer and academic
Malcolm Shaw (rower) (1947–2014), Australian rower
Malcolm Shaw (soccer) (born 1995), Canadian soccer player
María Pía Shaw, Argentine journalist
Martin Shaw (born 1945), English actor
Marlena Shaw (born 1943), American singer
Melville J. Shaw (1872–1927), Marine Corps Brevet Medal recipient
Naman Shaw, Indian television actor
Napier Shaw (1854–1945), British meteorologist
Norman Shaw (rugby league), rugby league footballer of the 1920s and 1930s
Oscar Shaw (1887–1967), American actor and singer

P–Z
Pamela Shaw, British neurologist
Patrick Shaw (diplomat) (1913–1975), Australian diplomat
Pauline Agassiz Shaw (1841–1917), American philanthropist and social reformer 
Percy Shaw (1890–1976), British inventor of the cat's-eye reflector for roads
Peter Shaw (disambiguation), several people
Prithvi Shaw (born 1999), Indian cricketer
Quincy Adams Shaw (1825–1908), American investor and industrialist
Rebecca Shaw (disambiguation), several people
Reta Shaw (born 1912), American actress
Richard G. Shaw (born 1943), first African American insurance commissioner for West Virginia
Richard Norman Shaw (1831–1912), British architect
Robert Shaw (disambiguation), several people
Ronald Shaw (1920–1945), Royal Air Force corporal during World War II
Ruth Shaw (disambiguation), several people
Sally Shaw (born 1978), Australian cricketer
Sam Shaw (disambiguation), several people
Samantha Shaw (born 1957), American politician
Samuel Shaw (disambiguation), several people
Sandie Shaw (born 1947), British singer
Sebastian Shaw (disambiguation), several people
Simon Shaw (born 1973), English rugby union player
Spencer Shaw (1916–2010), American librarian
Stanford J. Shaw (1930–2006), American historian
Susan Shaw (disambiguation), several people
Suzanne Shaw (born 1981), British actress and singer
Sylvia Shaw Judson (1897–1978), also known as Sylvia Shaw Haskins, American sculptor and teacher
T. E. Shaw, pseudonym of T. E. Lawrence ("Lawrence of Arabia")
Terrey Shaw (1946–1997), Australian chess master
Tevin Shaw (born 1997), Jamaican footballer
Thomas Shaw (disambiguation), several people
Todd Shaw, birth name of American rapper Too Short
Tom Shaw (disambiguation), several people
Tommy Shaw (born 1953) American musician (Styx)
Toni Shaw (born 2003), British Paralympic swimmer
Tony Shaw (Australian rules footballer) (born 1960), Australian rules footballer & media personality
Travis Shaw (born 1990), American baseball player
Vero Shaw (1854–1905), Indian-born English cricketer and Scottish clan chief
Watkins Shaw (1911–1996), British musicologist
Wayne Shaw (disambiguation), several people
Wilbur Shaw (1902–1954), American race car driver
William Arthur Shaw (1865–1943), English historian and archivist
William James Shaw (1877–1939), American entrepreneur and philanthropist
Willis R. Shaw (1860–1933), American politician
Woody Shaw (1944–1989), American jazz trumpeter
Zed Shaw, Canadian writer, software developer and musician

Fictional characters
 Daniel Shaw, in the TV series Chuck
 Sameen Shaw, in the TV series Person of Interest
 Deckard, Hattie, Magdalene, and Owen Shaw, from the Fast & Furious film series, see List of The Fast and the Furious characters
Shaw, from the animatedfilm Open Season 
Brandon Shaw, from the Alfred Hitchcock film Rope
Rev. Shaw Moore, from the film Footloose
Leah Shaw, from the TV show The Walking Dead

Chinese surnames

People by this surname with this spelling

 Runde Shaw (1899–1973)
 Runje Shaw (1896–1975)
 Runme Shaw (1901–1985), Hong Kong entertainment mogul and philanthropist
 Run Run Shaw (1907–2014), Hong Kong entertainment mogul and philanthropist

See also
Quintyne Schaw, makar mentioned in "Lament for the Makaris"
Shaw (disambiguation)
Clan Shaw of Tordarroch, Scottish clan
Shao, Chinese family name also spelled as "Shaw"
Shah (surname)
Xiao (surname), Chinese family name also spelled as "Shaw"

References

External links

Surname "Shaw", forebears.co.uk

English-language surnames
Scottish surnames